Sadovy is a rural locality (a settlement) in Rudnyanskoye Urban Settlement, Rudnyansky District, Volgograd Oblast, Russia. The population was 231 as of 2010. There are 2 streets.

Geography 
Sadovy is located in steppe, on the left bank of the Shchelkan River, 8 km north of Rudnya (the district's administrative centre) by road. Podkuykovo is the nearest rural locality.

References 

Rural localities in Rudnyansky District, Volgograd Oblast